Mesquita is Portuguese and Galician surname meaning "mosque". Notable people with the name include:

Aender Naves Mesquita, Brazilian footballer
Bruce Bueno de Mesquita, American political scientist
Caroline Mesquita, French artist
Dayenne Mesquita, Brazilian actress
Idalina Mesquita, Brazilian handball player
Jaqueline Mesquita (born 1985), Brazilian mathematician
Jerônima Mesquita, Brazilian feminist
Michel Platini Mesquita, Brazilian footballer
Quintiliano de Mesquita, Brazilian physician and scientist
Raul Mesquita, Portuguese author
Rodrigo Paixão Mesquita, Brazilian footballer
Samuel Jessurun de Mesquita, Dutch artist
Tiago Mesquita, Portuguese footballer
Vanessa Mesquita, Brazilian model
Vicente Nicolau de Mesquita, officer of the Portuguese Army in Macau

Portuguese-language surnames